Laila Marrakchi (born 1975 in Casablanca) is a Moroccan film maker most famous for the controversial film Marock. The film was screened in the Un Certain Regard section at the 2005 Cannes Film Festival.
She is married to film director Alexandre Aja. She grew up in the upper class Casablanca milieu that is portrayed in Marock.

Filmography

Director 
 Marock (2005)
 Momo mambo (2003)
 Deux cents dirhams (2002)
 Horizon perdu, L' (2000)
 Rock the Casbah (2013)
 The Eddy (2020) TV

See also

 Sanaa Hamri
 Doha Moustaquim

References

External links

Alumni of Lycée Lyautey (Casablanca)
Sorbonne Nouvelle University Paris 3 alumni
Moroccan film directors
Moroccan women film directors
People from Casablanca
1975 births
Living people